Katina Kramos (born 12 July 1972) is a Greek softball player. She competed in the women's tournament at the 2004 Summer Olympics.

References

1972 births
Living people
Greek softball players
Olympic softball players of Greece
Softball players at the 2004 Summer Olympics
Sportspeople from Kansas City, Missouri
Softball players from Missouri